K. Gurusamy (Born January 13, 1924) was an Indian politician and former Member of the Legislative Assembly. He was elected to the Tamil Nadu legislative assembly as a Dravida Munnetra Kazhagam candidate from Srivilliputhur constituency in 1971 election.

References 

Dravida Munnetra Kazhagam politicians
Members of the Tamil Nadu Legislative Assembly
1924 births
Year of death missing